Elizabeth Miller (1967) is a former Australian politician who was elected in the 2010 Victorian state election for the Electoral district of Bentleigh, defeating the safe Labor seat of Labor MP Rob Hudson. She served as the MP for Bentleigh for 4 years. The seat in 2014 changed to Nick Staikos by 0.8% preferences, redistribution and by illegal Red Shirts Rort’s and five union movement activities which was legally questioned by the Ombudsman in Victoria.

Career 
Elizabeth Miller was the Member for Bentleigh from 2010 to 2014.

References

Living people
Members of the Victorian Legislative Assembly
Liberal Party of Australia members of the Parliament of Victoria
21st-century Australian politicians
21st-century Australian women politicians
Women members of the Victorian Legislative Assembly
People educated at Star of the Sea College, Melbourne
Year of birth missing (living people)